is a Japanese gravure idol from Tokyo, Japan.

Although not well known outside Japan, she's one of the most famous Japanese idols in Japan. She is well known for her prodigious breasts although their reported size is greatly disputed, particularly for a woman her size.

Biography
Saori Yamamoto was born and raised in Tokyo.  She began modeling at the age of 15. After a few months her career took off. She released her first DVD a year later called Pure Smile.

Saori has appeared in many stage productions and television shows in Japan. Her first non-solo DVD appearances were in the high action movie Bra Shooter. In addition to modeling and acting, she currently plays for a Japanese soccer team called Team Spazio

Like many J-idols, Saori Yamamoto was also featured in a video game/DVD called Gal of the Sparrow 2, which she announced at 2005's Tokyo Game Show. This DVD features other popular J-idols such as Chikako Sakuragi, Rio Natsume, Yuka Watanabe, Akari, Kaede Shimizu, Hitomi Okada and Hatsune Matsushima. This DVD/video game is only for sale in Japan.

CD releases
 Toki (3/20/2004)

DVD releases
 Protea (05/2002)
 Pure Smile (05/2003)
 ぴちぴちピーチ! Pichi Pichi Peach! (08/21/2003)
 Saory (11/28/2003)
 ぷりぷりプリン! Idol One: Puripuri Purin! (03/20/2004)
 Saori no Tenshi in Seoul Q (06/25/2004)
 山本早織:Letter (07/25/2004)
 妹・早織 (10/22/2004)
 VIVA!そら。真っさお。Viva! Sora Massao (11/25/2004)
 起きて。ワタシ Okite. Watashi (2/25/2005)
 AMUSE (04/25/2005)
 ぷりんアラモードBOX Purin Alamode Box (05/20/05)
 APPLE (6/25/2005)
 Idol One - Dai 3 Dan Saori Yamamoro / Saorita Thank You 19 (10/20/2005)
 Idol One Dai 4 Dan - Saori Yamamoto / Yamamoro Welcome 20 (11/20/2005)
 Orihime (02/24/2006)
 Asatte-Dance (03/23/2006)
 Kawaru Watashi (06/28/2006)
 Destiny (08/01/2006)

Photograph set
 3年5組38番 3 year 5 set 38th page 96 digital B COM (Photograph Set) (1/23/2004)
 Sun‐Chu! (Photograph Collection) (3/27/2004)
 Delusion (02/2006)

V-Cinema 
 Taima Angel Bizarre Shooter Bishojo Senshi Sara Kenzan (退魔天使 ビザール・シューター 美少女戦士沙良見参!), June 12, 2005
 Hazard Saga, April 28, 2006
 Hazard Angel Crimson, May 12, 2006
 Hazard Angel Darkness, May 26, 2006
 Kyodai Heroine MARIYA -Korin- (巨大ヒロインMARIYA -降臨-), June 9, 2006
 Kyodai Heroine MARIYA -Sairin- (巨大ヒロインMARIYA -最臨-), July 14, 2006
 Homeless Shojo ～Bombie Girl no Koi～(ホームレス少女 ～貧乏少女の恋～), June 25, 2008

Theatrical films
 Enkiri Village: Dead End Survival (2011)

Notes

External links
 Official Website
 Saori Yamaoto's Blog
 Slide shows [DEAD LINK]
 Resumé
 山本早織 (Yamamoto Saori) Filmography at jmdb.ne.jp
 

Japanese gravure idols
1985 births
Living people
People from Tokyo
Japanese television personalities